Caleb Ray Farley (born November 2, 1998) is an American football cornerback for the Tennessee Titans of the National Football League (NFL). He played college football at Virginia Tech and was drafted by the Titans in the first round of the 2021 NFL Draft.

Early years
Farley attended Maiden High School in Maiden, North Carolina. He played quarterback in high school. As a senior he passed for 1,776 yards with 21 touchdowns and rushed for 2,574 yards with 37 rushing touchdowns. For his career he had 10,425 total yards and 124 touchdowns. He committed to Virginia Tech to play college football.

College career
Farley originally intended to be a wide receiver his freshman year at Virginia Tech in 2017, but missed the season due to a torn ACL. Returning from the injury in 2018, he was converted into a cornerback. He finished the season with 36 tackles, two interceptions and a sack. In 2019 Farley was named a first-team All-ACC after recording 20 tackles, four interceptions, and a touchdown.

Farley returned to Virginia Tech for his junior season in 2020 but later opted out due to COVID-19 pandemic.

Professional career

Farley was considered a very risky prospect for the upcoming NFL Draft due to concerns over his multiple injuries and recent back problems. As a result, his draft stock fell and he was regarded as a high risk-high reward player.

Farley was drafted by the Tennessee Titans with the 22nd overall pick in the 2021 NFL Draft. On May 13, 2021, the Titans signed Farley to a fully guaranteed four-year, $13.945 million contract. Heading into training camp, Farley was placed on the non-football injury list on July 24, 2021.  He passed a physical and was activated off the non-football injury list on August 2, 2021, playing in his first practice the same day.

In Week 6, Farley suffered a torn ACL and was placed on season-ending injured reserve on October 19, 2021.

Farley entered the 2022 season as a backup cornerback for the Titans. He played in nine games before suffering a herniated disk in his back in Week 10. He was placed on injured reserve on November 15, 2022.

References

External links

Virginia Tech Hokies bio

1998 births
Living people
People from Maiden, North Carolina
Players of American football from North Carolina
American football cornerbacks
Virginia Tech Hokies football players
Tennessee Titans players